Rec 2 (stylized as [•REC]²) is a 2009 Spanish found footage horror film sequel to 2007's Rec and the second installment of the Rec film series. The film was written and directed by Jaume Balagueró and Paco Plaza, both of whom returned from the previous film. The story takes place immediately after the events of the first film and follows a team of soldiers assigned to protect a scientist supposedly sent to investigate the cause of the outbreak, but who may already know more about it than he claims.

Several actors from the first film reprise their roles, mostly briefly appearing as infected versions of their characters. The film was followed by Rec 3: Genesis.

Plot
Dr. Owen (Jonathan Mellor), an official from the Ministry of Health, and a heavily armed GEO team of four (Fernandez, Martos, Rosso and Larra) equipped with video cameras are sent into a quarantined apartment building to find out what happened to its inhabitants, who have been rendered infectious and violent by a contagious virus. Ascending to the attic (where the first film ended) and finding it unoccupied, they return downstairs to investigate a disturbance and are attacked by infected residents.

During the investigation, Martos is infected while encountering some of the possessed residents. Owen then uses religious mantra and a rosary to hold him off in a room. He reveals that he is actually a priest sent by the Vatican to get a blood sample from a possessed girl named Tristana Medeiros, the root of the infection. The GEO operators search the apartment where Medeiros was held and find the body of Father Albelda, the original priest charged with the case of Medeiros's possession. They then find a sample of Medeiros's blood taken by Albelda, but lose it to Fernandez's improper handling. Owen tells them that the only way to accomplish the mission now is to get a blood sample from Tristana herself. They are attacked by a group of infected, and Larra, separated from the others and cornered into a room, commits suicide.

The father of Jennifer persuades a firefighter to help him enter the building through the sewers. They are unknowingly followed by three teenagers, Tito, Mire and Ori, and the police seal their exit. Jennifer's father is bitten and infected and killed by Owen and the GEO team, while the firefighter is attacked by Martos and killed accidentally by Mire, who kills Martos right after. After Tito is infected, Owen, Fernandez and Rosso find the group. They lock Mire and Ori in a room and encounter reporter Ángela Vidal (Manuela Velasco) shocked but safe. The group questions the possessed Tito and deduce from his cryptic answers that Medeiros is in the penthouse and that certain areas are only accessible in total darkness aside from infrared light.

The group finds a hidden door using the night vision on Ángela's camera. They are attacked by Medeiros, who kills Fernandez, and attacks Owen before Ángela blows her head off with a shotgun. Owen is enraged because he needed the blood sample, but the unnerved Ángela can only think to leave the building. When Owen refuses to authorize their exit, Ángela attacks him and kills Rosso when he attempts an intervention. It is revealed that the demon possessing Tristana has now possessed Ángela. Ángela kills Owen and imitates his voice to contact the authorities. She tells them that the mission has been accomplished, that Owen must stay inside due to being infected, and that the only survivor allowed to leave is Ángela. A flashback then reveals what happened right before the story's beginning: Ángela was captured by Medeiros and had a vermiform organism orally transmitted into her. As the response team arrived, Ángela went into hiding.

Cast

Production
Following the success of Rec, Jaume Balagueró and Paco Plaza signed on for a sequel. Principal photography began on 10 November 2008 and wrapped in December 2008. The film reunites the directors with many of the original cast and crew members of the previous film. It was shot in Barcelona over six weeks.

Release
The film premiered at the 66th Venice International Film Festival, out of competition. It was also shown at the Midnight Madness portion of the 2009 Toronto International Film Festival, as well as the 2009 Fantastic Fest in Austin, Texas, and the 2009 Sitges Film Festival. It went on general release in Spain the first weekend of October, going to No. 1 in the Spanish box office and achieving the best opening weekend of the year for a Spanish film.

Rec 2 was released in New Zealand theaters by Vendetta Films on 13 November 2009. The marketing budget for the film, NZ$7500, was used to create a website, where the remaining $5000 marketing budget would be given away to the member of the public who was judged responsible for the most good publicity generated for the release of the film. Sony Pictures Home Entertainment will release the film on DVD in October 2010. In March 2010 Magnolia Pictures acquired the rights for the US market and will screen the film in a theatrical release in July 2010. The distributor Magnolia pictures will screen the film on Video on Demand platforms on 4 June 2010 and released the film only on DVD. Magnolia has the film set with a release on 9 July 2010 and released on 30 March 2010 the UK trailer.

The film was released on 28 May 2010 in the UK. It is part of the Terror in the Aisles 4 at the Portage Theater in Chicago, Illinois.

Reception
Rec 2 received generally positive reviews. On Rotten Tomatoes, the film has a "fresh" 68% rating based on 72 reviews, with an average rating of 6.21/10. The site's consensus states: "It lacks the surprising jolt of the first installment, but [REC] 2 almost maintains the original's chilling momentum – and proves not all horror sequels were made equal".

Reviewing the film in The New York Times, Jeannette Catsoulis praised the sound design and the directing, but criticised the sequel's lack of terror found in the original film, and its anti-Catholic sentiment and repetitive staging.

Little White Lies gave the film 4/5 and called it "The greatest zombie sequel since Dawn of the Dead". Empire also awarded the film 4 stars, saying: "Here’s a horror juddering with such in-your-face malevolent energy, it’s like being caught in a first-person shooter possessed by the devil".

However, the Daily Mirror awarded the film 2 stars, and reviewer David Edwards stated it was "a bit of a W[rec]k."

Sequels

On 3 May 2010, Bloody Disgusting announced that "...Filmax will produce two new [REC] films in the next couple of years called [REC] 3: Genesis and [REC] 4 with the same directors as the first two films." Genesis was released on 30 March 2012, and centers on an outbreak in a distant location from the original apartment building, also having prequel elements. [REC] 4 ended the saga with the infection spreading on a ship. The movie was released 31 October 2014 .

See also 
 List of Spanish films of 2009

References

External links

 
 
 
 
 Facebook Page

2009 films
2009 horror films
2009 independent films
Apocalyptic films
Demons in film
Films about infectious diseases
Films directed by Jaume Balagueró
Films directed by Paco Plaza
Films set in apartment buildings
Films set in Barcelona
Films shot in Barcelona
Films with screenplays by Jaume Balagueró
Found footage films
Rec (film series)
Religious horror films
2000s supernatural horror films
Spanish independent films
2000s Spanish-language films
Spanish sequel films
Spanish supernatural horror films
Filmax films
Castelao Producciones films
2000s Spanish films